Wolfgang Zilzer (January 20, 1901 – June 26, 1991) was a German-American stage and film actor, often under the stage name Paul Andor.

Biography
Zilzer was born in Cincinnati, Ohio, to German-Jewish emigrant Max Zilzer, who was employed at the local theater. Zilzer's mother died soon after his birth, and his father returned to Germany in 1905.

Zilzer appeared on stage in child roles and made his first movie appearance in the age of 14. Around 1930, he moved back to the United States, but had only small success as an actor. He returned to Germany. According to a 1943 Jewish Telegraphic Agency newspaper article, he "was a featured player of UFA in the palmy days before the Furore [Hitler]", but after Adolf Hitler's rise to power, Zilzer fled to France, where he worked dubbing voices in several French versions of Hollywood productions. In 1935, Zilzer returned to Germany again, finally emigrating to the US in 1937. Applying for a visa at the U.S. embassy, he first realized he already had US citizenship. After his emigration, he started to work with Ernst Lubitsch in several anti-Nazi movies, using pseudonyms to protect his father, who was still living in Berlin. With appearances in films from 1915 to 1986, Zilzer had one of the longest careers in cinema history. The Internet Broadway Database lists a single credit for a Wolfgang Zilzer, in the 1943 play The Barber Had Two Sons.

Zilzer married the German-Jewish actress Lotte Palfi; both appeared in the 1942 movie Casablanca. Zilzer played the man without a passport who is shot by French policemen at the beginning of the film. After World War II, Zilzer performed on stage in the United States and in Germany.

At the end of the 1980s Zilzer contracted Parkinson's disease and decided to return to Germany. His wife refused to do so, and their marriage ended in divorce after almost 50 years, close to both their deaths.

Wolfgang Zilzer died in Berlin on June 26, 1991 aged 90 and is buried at the Waldfriedhof Zehlendorf.

Selected filmography

 Der Barbier von Flimersdorf (1915)
 Professor Erichsons Rivale (1916)
 Die Spinne (1917)
 The Ancient Law (1923) – Page
 Vineta. Die versunkene Stadt (1923)
 Schützenliesel (1926) – Dr. Blasius Nestl
 Das edle Blut (1927) – Von Günsfeld
 Forbidden Love (1927) – Freund von Hans
 Poor Little Colombine (1927) – Christoph Burger
 Venus im Frack (1927)
 Mata Hari (1927) – Erzherzog Oskar
 Primanerliebe (1927) – Rolf Karsten
 The Marriage Nest (1927) – Leutnant Wranow
 Alpine Tragedy (1927) – Fredo, Lehrer
 The Awakening of Woman (1927) – Fritz Wille, Sohn
 The White Spider (1927) – Diener bei Lord Barrymore
 Schwere Jungs - leichte Mädchen (1927) – Hoppler
 Die Geliebte des Gouverneurs (1927) – Husarenoffizier
 Alraune (1928) – Wölfchen
 Thérèse Raquin (1928) – Camille Raquin
 Eve's Daughters (1928) – Baron Hans von Stetten / Jean de Stetten
 When the Mother and the Daughter (1928)
 Sir or Madam (1928)
 Lemke's Widow (1928)
 Docks of Hamburg (1928) – The nipper
 The Abduction of the Sabine Women (1928) – Balsamo, Intrigant
 Hotelgeheimnisse (1929) – Komplize des Hochstaplers
 Painted Youth (1929) – Walter
 The Right of the Unborn (1929) – Fredy
 The Woman in the Advocate's Gown (1929) – Leif Andersen
 Crucified Girl (1929)
 Tragedy of Youth (1929) – Emil
 Revolt in the Reformatory (1930) – Hans
 Karriere (1930)
 Such Is Life (1930) – Wooer
 Marriage in Name Only (1930) – Max Benken
 Retreat on the Rhine (1930) – Karl, Oskars Bursche
 Boycott (1930)- Möller, Oberprimaner
 Bookkeeper Kremke (1930)
 Wibbel the Tailor (1931) – Schneidergeselle Zimpel
 Ash Wednesday (1931) – Neufert
 Casanova wider Willen (1931)
 Raid in St. Pauli (1932) – Musiker-Leo
 Strafsache von Geldern (1932)
 Ever in My Heart (1933) – Voice of Hugo Wilbrandt (French version) (uncredited)
 Bluebeard's Eighth Wife (1938) – Book Salesman (uncredited)
 Crime Ring (1938) – Hans, the Forger (uncredited)
 I'll Give a Million (1938) – Citizen (uncredited)
 Hotel Imperial (1939) – Limping Tenor (uncredited)
 Confessions of a Nazi Spy (1939) – Westphal 
 Espionage Agent (1939) – Heinrich (uncredited)
 Ninotchka (1939) – Taxi Driver (uncredited)
 Hitler - Beast of Berlin (1939) – Kleswing 
 Television Spy (1939) – Frome
 Everything Happens at Night (1939) – Thief at Dock (uncredited)
 Dr. Ehrlich's Magic Bullet (1940) – Kellner (uncredited)
 Four Sons (1940) – Peasant (uncredited)
 Three Faces West (1940) – Dr. Rudolf Preussner (uncredited)
 A Dispatch from Reuter's (1940) – Post Office Clerk (uncredited)
 Escape (1940) – Pavillion Counter Clerk (uncredited)
 So Ends Our Night (1941) – Vogt (uncredited)
 Forbidden Passage (1941 short) – Otto Kestler
 Out of Darkness (1941 short) – Leon Rochelle – Second Editor of La Libre Belgique (uncredited)
 Shining Victory (1941) – Subordinate (uncredited)
 Underground (1941) – Hoffman
 World Premiere (1941) – Bushmaster's Aide (uncredited)
 All Through the Night (1941) – Frascher (uncredited)
 The Lady Has Plans (1942) – German Clerk – Baron's Office (uncredited)
 To Be or Not to Be (1942) – Man in Bookstore (uncredited)
 Joan of Ozark (1942) – Kurt 
 Invisible Agent (1942) – Von Porten (uncredited)
 Berlin Correspondent (1942) – Patient (uncredited)
 The Devil with Hitler (1942 short) – Otto Schultz (uncredited)
 Casablanca (1942) – Man with Expired Papers (uncredited)
 Margin for Error (1943) – Bit Part (uncredited)
 They Got Me Covered (1943) – Cross (uncredited)
 Assignment in Brittany (1943) – Captain Deichgraber's Aide (uncredited)
 They Came to Blow Up America (1943) – Schlegel
 Hitler's Madman (1943) – SS Colonel (uncredited)
 Appointment in Berlin (1943) – Cripple (uncredited)
 Bomber's Moon (1943) – Nazi Doctor Treating Jeff
 Behind the Rising Sun (1943) – Max (uncredited)
 The Strange Death of Adolf Hitler (1943) – Attorney
 Paris After Dark (1943) – German Announcer (uncredited)
 In Our Time (1944) – Father Józef (uncredited)
 They Live in Fear (1944) – Old Man (uncredited)
 Enemy of Women (1944) – Dr. Paul Joseph Goebbels (as Paul Andor)
 Hotel Berlin (1945) – Walter Baumler (uncredited)
 Counter-Attack (1945) – Krafft (as Paul Andor)
 Week-End at the Waldorf (1945) – Waiter (uncredited)
 Stairway to Light (1945 short) – Dr. Philippe Pinel (uncredited)
 Carnegie Hall (1947) – Waiter (uncredited)
 Women in the Night (1948) – German Doctor (as Paul Ander) 
 Walk East on Beacon! (1952) – August Helmuth (as Paul Andor)
 Singing in the Dark (1956) – Refugee (as Paul Andor)
 Terror After Midnight (1962) – Vater Reynolds
 Der Chef wünscht keine Zeugen (1964)
 Mister Buddwing (1966) – Man on the Street (uncredited)
 The Diary of Anne Frank (1967, TV film)
 Union City (1980) – Ludendorff (as Paul Andor)
 Lovesick (1983) – Analyst (as Paul Andor)
 FDR: A One Man Show (1986 TV film) – Understudy
 The Passenger – Welcome to Germany (1988) – Levi (final film role)

Partial television credits
 Claudia: The Story of a Marriage (1952 TV series)
 The United States Steel Hour (1957 TV episode "The Bottle Imp")
 Late Night with David Letterman (1983–85) (recurring role, as Paul Andor or "Old Henry")

References

 Bibliography 
John Holmstrom, The Moving Picture Boy: An International Encyclopaedia from 1895 to 1995'', Norwich, Michael Russell, 1996, p. 17.

External links

 
 
 
 
 
 
 Biography of Casablanca- actors
 Photographs of Wolfgang Zilzer

1901 births
1991 deaths
German male film actors
German male silent film actors
German male stage actors
German male child actors
American male film actors
American male stage actors
American people of German-Jewish descent
American emigrants to Germany
Jewish American male actors
Jewish German male actors
Male actors from Cincinnati
20th-century German male actors
20th-century American male actors
Burials at the Waldfriedhof Zehlendorf
20th-century American Jews